Hear Sum Evil is the second official mixtape by American rap group Da Mafia 6ix, formerly known as Three 6 Mafia released October 30, 2014. Lord Infamous posthumously appears on three tracks on the mixtape with additional guest appearances from former No Limit Records artist Fiend, MJG, Paul Wall, La Chat, Lil Wyte, DJ Zirk, YB The Rich Rocka, Locodunit and Charlie P.

Background 

The group originally planned to release their debut studio album on the release date of the mixtape however, DJ Paul stated that they pushed the album back to promote it more. DJ Paul decided to release the mixtape instead to serve as a substitution and to uphold his promise to fans of new music.

The three tracks featuring Lord Infamous were noted as "with Lord Infamous" on the album to distinguish to fans the tracks that included the late artist.

DJ Paul released the official audio of "Lock'm N Da Trunk" featuring DJ Zirk on July 11, 2014
 followed by the official audio of "Payin' Top Dolla" featuring Fiend & La Chat on October 13, 2014.

Track list

Music videos

The official music video for "Lock'm N Da Trunk" was released on October 28, 2014

The official music video for "Hear Sum Evil Intro" was released on November 25, 2014.

The official music video for "Hydrocodone" was released on January 29, 2015. Paul Wall and Crunchy Black's verses were cut for unknown reasons.

References 

Three 6 Mafia albums
Hip hop compilation albums